Dairy is a significant part of the agricultural output of the state of New York. New York ranks forth out of the fifty states in dairy production. The state's nearly 4,000 dairy farms annually produce over 15 billion pounds of milk.

History
During the colonial era, dairy cows were an important part of every family farm. Their milk was turned into butter and cheese, making them an important part of the diet as they could be stored easily. 

At the end of the 19th century, with the population of the state rapidly expanding, farms began to focus entirely on dairy. Farms became larger operations that shipped their products to cities in their regions on railroad. With the advent of refrigeration and strict food safety laws, fresh unadulterated milk could easily be purchased by all classes.

Today, dairy farming is concentrated in Upstate New York.

See also

 Swill milk scandal

References 

Milk
Economy of New York (state)
Agriculture in New York (state)
Dairy farming in the United States